Dimitris Karademitros (born 6 May 1983) is a Greek footballer. A right-sided winger, he is known for his speed, as well as his remarkable dribbling skills and scoring capabilities.

Career
Karademitros began his career in Olympiakos Volou, Greece. In January 2005, he moved to Nikaia and signed with Ionikos FC. As of July 2010, he plays for Apollon Smyrnis.

References

External links
 profile at epae.org

1983 births
Living people
Association football wingers
Greek expatriate footballers
Olympiacos Volos F.C. players
Apollon Smyrnis F.C. players
Ionikos F.C. players
Ethnikos Piraeus F.C. players
OFC Vihren Sandanski players
Expatriate footballers in Bulgaria
Greek expatriates in Bulgaria
First Professional Football League (Bulgaria) players
Footballers from Athens
Greek footballers
Greek expatriate sportspeople in Bulgaria